

Films

References

2018
2018
2018-related lists